The 1904 Georgetown Blue and Gray football team represented Georgetown University during the 1904 college football season. Led by Joe Reilly in his first year as head coach, the team went 7–1 and claims a Southern championship.

Schedule

Players

Line

Backfield

References

Georgetown
Georgetown Hoyas football seasons
Georgetown Blue and Gray football